Delores Dufner is an American sacred music composer, librettist, and organist whose works have been included in Catholic hymnals in the United States, Canada, the United Kingdom and Australia. Dufner is a nun of the Order of Saint Benedict at Saint Benedict's Monastery in Saint Joseph, Minnesota.  She is on the faculty of Saint Benedict's College and Saint John's University, Collegeville, Minnesota. In 1994, Dufner was commissioned to write the libretto for the oratorio Choose Life, Uvacharta Bachayim. "One of the best-known hymn writers in the church today. More than twenty different publishers have included her texts in their hymnals and hymn collections. In 2017 Dufner received the Christus Rex (“Christ the King”) award from the Lutheran Valparaiso University.

References

External links
 WPL Biography 
Delores Dufner profile at Allmusic
 Books of hymn texts

20th-century American Roman Catholic nuns
21st-century American composers
Benedictine nuns
Musicians from Minnesota
Living people
Year of birth missing (living people)
21st-century American women musicians
21st-century American Roman Catholic nuns
21st-century women composers
American women hymnwriters
20th-century American composers
20th-century women composers
20th-century American women musicians